Haguenauer is a surname. Notable people with the surname include:

 Jean-Louis Haguenauer (born 1954), French classical pianist
 Michel Haguenauer (1916–2000), French international table tennis player
 Romain Haguenauer (born 1976), French ice dancing coach, choreographer, and former competitor

French-language surnames